Edgardo Rafael Cuevas Feliciano (San Juan; Puerto Rico, April 22, 1995) better known by his stage name as Lyanno, is a Puerto Rican singer-songwriter of R&B Reggaetón and Trap Latino.

Music career 
He studied sound engineering at the Liceo de Arte y Tecnología of San Juan in Puerto Rico. His beginnings in music were with the singer Almighty, who gave him the opportunity to work in his studio as a music producer.

In 2015 he began his career as a singer under the name of "Gardo", becoming known in the music industry with his song "Frutos prohibidos", this being a mix of R&B with Hip hop. At first, his music was broad in content and with this style he released two EPs: S.O.D.A (2016) and AM (2017).

In 2017 he chabged name was changed from Gardo to Lyanno. Starting a new stage in music, releasing the single Exclusiva, a collaboration with Farruko under the production of Los de la Nazza, later released the Remix version with Chris Wandell, Rauw Alejandro and Brray.

The following year he began to gain popularity by collaborating on tracks by other singers such as Myke Towers, Rafa Pabón and Lunay, with the latter he collaborated on the single "A Solas", while with Ozuna, Rauw Alejandro y Lunay he collaborated on the topic "Luz Apaga" which was ranked 26th on the Hot Latin Songs chart.

In 2019 he premiered his third EP, but this time without obscene content that was called Episodios, with the production of the record label Rima Music. At the end of that same year, he was nominated for the Youth Awards in the category of "New Urban Generation".

On February 14, 2020, he released the remix of the song "En tu cuerpo" together with his countrymen Rauw Alejandro, Lenny Tavárez and the Argentine singer María Becerra. "En tu cuerpo" ranked number 16 on the Billboard Hot 100 list of Argentine artists and ended up being certified Platinum (Latin) by Recording Industry Association of America (RIAA) in 2021. In April he collaborated with  Piso 21 and Jerry Di on the hit "Luna llena" which reached more than 12 million views on YouTube and 4 million streams in Spotify, it was also a trend in Spain on that platform for four consecutive weeks, even reaching the number 1 position in Colombia.

Discography

EPs 
 S.O.D.A (2016) 
 AM (2017) 
 Episodios (2019)
 Foreplay (2020)
 Pa la Calle (2021)
 El Cambio (2022)

Awards and nominations 
Premios Juventud

Premios Tu Música Urbano

References 

1996 births
21st-century Puerto Rican male singers
Puerto Rican reggaeton musicians
Puerto Rican rappers
Living people